Neoparamoeba pemaquidensis is a single-celled species of marine amoebozoan in the genus Neoparamoeba. The species is also called Paramoeba pemaquidensis.

Its closely related sister species, Neoparamoeba perurans, is the agent of amoebic gill disease, which affects Atlantic salmon and other farmed fishes.

References

Amoebozoa genera